Lawrence Thomas "The Pope" Popein (August 11, 1930 – February 7, 2020) was a Canadian professional ice hockey player and coach.

Playing career
Popein began his career with the Moose Jaw Canucks of the Saskatchewan Junior Hockey League. He then signed with the Vancouver Canucks of the Western Hockey League. During his playing time with this organization, he developed a special affinity for British Columbia's largest city.

In 1954, Popein's contract was acquired by the New York Rangers and he began his National Hockey League (NHL) career. Although a relatively small skater at 5 ft 9 in, 170 lbs, Popein developed a reputation as a stoic, fearless, hard-working player who was a solid body checker and a skilled passer. He was the quiet centre on a powerful line that included Andy Bathgate and Dean Prentice. Early in the 1960–61 season, after six years as a Rangers starter, Popein was returned to the Canucks. He briefly returned to the NHL during the 1967-68 season, as expansion allowed many veterans to crack the lineups of fledgling teams, with Popein spending one year with the Oakland Seals.

Upon retiring from the ice, Popein entered coaching. He served as the bench boss of the Omaha Knights of the Central Hockey League, then as an assistant coach with the Rangers; he briefly was the interim head coach of this club during the 1973–74 season, coaching for 41 games. He was fired on January 11, 1974 after suspending Rod Gilbert for a game due to missing a team meeting: the meeting time had been moved but Popein had not informed Gilbert, though he upheld the suspension. With this move the rest of the Rangers lost confidence in Popein, forcing him out.

The next year, Popein became director of player development of the new NHL incarnation of the Vancouver Canucks. After a clean sweep of the Vancouver front office, Popein took a job with the Calgary Flames in 1986, serving as a scout until his 1992 retirement.

In the 2009 book 100 Ranger Greats, the authors ranked Popein at No. 91 all-time of the 901 New York Rangers who had played during the team's first 82 seasons.

Career statistics

Regular season and playoffs

Coaching record

References

External links 
 

1930 births
2020 deaths
Canadian ice hockey coaches
Canadian ice hockey centres
Ice hockey people from Saskatchewan
Moose Jaw Canucks players
New York Rangers coaches
New York Rangers players
Oakland Seals players
Omaha Knights (CHL) players
Sportspeople from Yorkton
Springfield Indians players
Vancouver Canucks (WHL) players